Katinovac  is a village in central Croatia, in the municipality of Topusko, Sisak-Moslavina County.

History

Demographics
According to the 2011 census, the village of Katinovac has 90 inhabitants. This represents 25.79% of its pre-war population according to the 1991 census.

According to the 1991 census, 88.83% of the village population were ethnic Serbs (310/349), 0.86% were Yugoslavs (3/349), 0.57% were ethic Croats (2/349), 7.45% were Bosniaks (26/349) and 2.29% were of other ethnic origin (8/349).

Sights

Notable natives and residents

References

Populated places in Sisak-Moslavina County
Serb communities in Croatia